These are the results of the Women's Long Jump event at the 2001 World Championships in Athletics in Edmonton, Alberta, Canada.

Medalists

Schedule
All times are Mountain Standard Time (UTC-7)

Results

Qualification
Qualification: Qualifying Performance 6.70 (Q) or at least 12 best performers (q) advance to the final.

Final

References
Results
IAAF

Long Jump
Long jump at the World Athletics Championships
2001 in women's athletics